Albert Cordingley (13 May 1871 – 30 April 1945) was a professional English cricketer, who played first-class cricket for Sussex after failing to secure a place in the Yorkshire first team owing to competition from Wilfred Rhodes. Rhodes went on to become the leading wicket-taker in first-class cricket.

Yorkshire career
Rhodes and Cordingley were competing for a place in the Yorkshire team after the sacking of Bobby Peel in 1897. Cordingley was, at that stage, as well qualified for the position as Rhodes and had good reports from his time playing with Lytham. In a trial match at the end of the 1897 season, Cordingley took eight wickets for 33 runs for Yorkshire against the Yorkshire Colts team, and also took three wickets against the senior Yorkshire side in another game. In the same games, Rhodes took just two wickets for 99 runs. At the start of the 1898 season, both Cordingley and Rhodes played for Yorkshire Colts against Nottinghamshire Colts; Rhodes took one wicket for 14 and Cordingley took four for 37. Two days later, both men were included in the squad for Yorkshire against the Marylebone Cricket Club (M.C.C.). According to one story, Yorkshire captain Lord Hawke and leading amateur cricketer Stanley Jackson could not agree on which player to leave out, and chose Rhodes after spinning a coin. However, Hawke later denied this was the case. He claimed always to believe Rhodes the better bowler and said that Jackson came to the same view after seeing Rhodes bowling during practice. Rhodes took six for 33 in the game and was chosen to play in the next match, but Cordingley remained in the squad. However, during the game he received news of the death of his mother and returned home. Rhodes meanwhile took 13 wickets in the game and Cordingley accepted that there was no likelihood of taking his place. This gave rise to a legend that after seeing Rhodes bowl in his first match, Cordingley, accepting Rhodes' superiority, shook his hand and returned home without completing the team's tour of the South of England. Rhodes remained in the side for the rest of the season and took 141 wickets for Yorkshire. He was named one of Wisden's Cricketers of the Year and played for England the following season. He went on to take 4,184 wickets in a career lasting until 1930.

Sussex career
The Yorkshire Committee still considered Cordingley to have a place within the squad, particularly as his bowling style was different from that of Rhodes. However, Cordingley believed he would only be Rhodes' reserve and refused a contract in 1899. Instead, he became the professional at a cricket club in Nottinghamshire before moving to Sussex. He played club cricket in Brighton and qualified for the County team after making a good impression on the local press. He first played for Sussex in 1901 and, in total, he played 15 first-class games for the team, but his only notable performances were in 1902: he took five wickets for 22 runs against Nottinghamshire and shared a partnership of 115 for the ninth wicket with K. S. Ranjitsinhji. He remained with the club in 1903 but was not a first choice in the team and played only intermittently afterwards until 1905. He continued to live in Sussex and became a player, coach and groundsman at Pease Pottage, earning a good reputation for encouraging cricket in the local area. He died in 1945, aged 72.

The Daily Argus, a Bradford newspaper, noted that Cordingley had a technically good bowling action and could effectively alter the pace he bowled the ball. It described Cordingley as "a pleasant, modest young man."

Bibliography

References

1871 births
1945 deaths
English cricketers
Sussex cricketers
Cricketers from Bradford
English cricketers of 1890 to 1918